The  is located in Shiga Prefecture, Japan; it is the largest river to flow into Lake Biwa. It rises from Mount Gozaisho and flows through Kōka, Konan, Rittō, Moriyama and Yasu. It forked at the lower reaches and made a delta region, but they were combined in 1979.

History 
The Tōkaidō, one of the Edo Five Routes which connected east and west Japan during the Edo period, paralleled the river. Post towns along the river included Tsuchiyama-juku, Minakuchi-juku and Ishibe-juku. The Yasu River also crossed the Nakasendō, another one of the Edo Five Routes, separating Moriyama-juku and Musa-juku.

References
 Kinki Regional Development Bureau Biwako Office (Japanese)

External links 

 (mouth)

Rivers of Shiga Prefecture
Rivers of Japan